

References

See also

 List of AMD microprocessors
 List of AMD CPU microarchitectures
 List of AMD mobile microprocessors
 List of AMD Athlon microprocessors
 List of AMD Athlon XP microprocessors
 List of AMD Athlon 64 microprocessors
 List of AMD Athlon X2 microprocessors
 List of AMD Duron microprocessors
 List of AMD Sempron microprocessors
 List of AMD Turion microprocessors
 List of AMD Opteron microprocessors
 List of AMD Epyc microprocessors
 List of AMD Phenom microprocessors
 List of AMD FX microprocessors
 List of AMD Ryzen microprocessors
 List of AMD processors with 3D graphics
 List of Intel microprocessors
 List of Intel CPU microarchitectures
 Comparison of Intel processors

AMD

AMD Processors